August Ruyssevelt (born 4 November 1896, date of death unknown) was a Belgian footballer. He competed in the men's tournament at the 1928 Summer Olympics.

References

External links
 

1896 births
Year of death missing
Belgian footballers
Belgium international footballers
Olympic footballers of Belgium
Footballers at the 1928 Summer Olympics
Place of birth missing
Association football defenders